Psycho-Pass 2 is a 2014 anime series by Tatsunoko Production that serves as a direct sequel to the 2012–2013 series Psycho-Pass. It was directed by Naoyoshi Shiotani and Kiyotaka Suzuki, and supervised by Katsuyuki Motohiro and Gen Urobuchi. The series is written by Tow Ubukata, featuring scripts by Ubukata and Jun Kumagai. Character designs are by Akira Amano and adapted by Kyoji Asano. The series takes place in an authoritarian future, where omnipresent public sensors continuously scan the Psycho-Pass of every citizen in range. The sensors measure mental state, personality, and the probability that the citizen will commit crimes, alerting authorities when someone exceeds accepted norms. The story once again follows the Public Safety Bureau's Criminal Investigation Division, led by Inspector Akane Tsunemori, as they are caught up in another mysterious case. Psycho-Pass 2 aired on Fuji TV's Noitamina programming block between October and December 2014.

Plot
In Psycho-Pass 2, Tsunemori leads a restored Unit One that includes rookie inspector Mika Shimotsuki; Ginoza, who has been demoted to Enforcer; Kunizuka and two new Enforcers named Sakuya Togane and Sho Hinakawa. The team faces a new threat in the form of Kirito Kamui, another criminal mastermind who is invisible to the Sibyl System. He, like Makishima, intends to bring down the Sibyl System but, unlike Makishima, wants to do so by exploiting its flaws instead of wreaking havoc, and making it judge itself as a collective consciousness. Due to having parts from different people, he is skilled in avoiding all forms of detection as the Sibyl System is unable to recognize him. He is also skilled in making medication that helps his supporters keep their Crime Coefficients low. As a result, few believe that he actually exists. At the climax of this season, Akane Tsunemori leads Kirito Kamui to the core of the Sibyl System. In the end, Sibyl decides to recognize Kirito Kamui (鹿矛囲 桐斗), a collective mind of seven people.

Production

The first Psycho Pass series was first announced in late March 2012 by Fuji TV at its Noitamina press conference. In March 2013, Shiotani stated there could be a second season if the show received enough support. Psycho-Pass 2 was first announced on July 6, 2013 by Production I.G. president Mitsuhisa Ishikawa. Once development of the second season started, Shiotani said the new episodes were more difficult to make than those in the first season. He said, "it's more about the show's inflexibility" because the staff have to maintain consistency. For the second season Tow Ubukata replaced Urobuchi as the main writer. Ubukata mentions he was given the idea of expanding the setting in the form of a sequel. As a result of being given the scenario of the TV series and the film, Ubukata had to write the characters' personalities. Although the timeframe for the production was short, he had enough time to hold discussions with the first series' staff. Shiotani aided the team for the final episode which satisfied Ubukata. Gen Urobuchi claimed that both Psycho-Pass 2 and Psycho-Pass: The Movie would be more violent than the first series, advising sensitive people to avoid watching it.

Much attention was given to developing Tsunemori as a lead character since Kogami was no longer present. Additionally, the new character who works as an Inspector, Mika Shimotsuki, was given the traits of the newcomer similar to Tsunemori, but different in a way Shiotani could not explain during development as a result of the series still premiering. Since the first series was focused on Shinya Kogami and Shogo Makishima's rivalry, this time Kirito Kamui was written to be the rival of Tsunemori as a result of being her alone. Nevertheless, the staff felt that Kamui was a weaker antagonist than Makishima to the point Kogami would have easily solved the case had he been in the series. The staff were said to love Shimotsuki for the same reason that fans disliked her. Staff reported that, while Nobuchika Ginoza was used as an unlikable inspector in the first series, often the staff and the audience could not bring themselves to hate him. Given that reaction, they made Shimotsuki a less likable character.

The music is composed by Yugo Kanno. Two musical pieces are used: The series' opening theme which is "Enigmatic Feeling" by Ling tosite Sigure, and the ending theme which is "Fallen" by Egoist. The series was collected in a total of five DVD and Blu-ray volumes between December 17, 2014 and April 15, 2015. A collection was released on July 17, 2019.

The series is licensed in North America by Funimation, who simulcast the series with English subtitles as it aired and began streaming English dubbed episodes from November 8, 2014 as part of its Broadcast Dubs initiative. Funimation released the home media in North America, while Anime Ltd released it in the United Kingdom.

A manga adaptation by Saru Hashino was published in Monthly Comic Garden by Mag Garden. Hashino launched the manga series in November 5, 2014 and ended it in February 5, 2017.

Episode list

Home media release
Japanese

North American

United Kingdom

Reception
Feedback to Psycho-Pass 2 has ranged from mixed to negative. Dan Rhodes from UK Anime Network noted that Psycho-Pass 2, while entertaining, lacked the twists of the first season and appeal of Gen Urobuchi's writing. Richard Eisenbeis from Kotaku praised the origins of the Sybil System which was unexplained in the first season. While also praising the differences between Tsunemori and the new Inspector, Mika Shimotsuki, Eisenbeis criticized the new antagonist and how much gorier the series was in contrast to the first one. Nick Creamer from Anime News Network panned the series, giving it an overall "F" as he felt the new writer, Tow Ubukata, did not make the anime appealing despite his previous enjoyable works. He went on to say "overall, Psycho-Pass 2 stands as one of the most disappointing works I've ever watched to completion," citing it a failure as both a sequel and an independent series. Mitch Jay from Digital Rice criticized the handling of Tsunemori since the events that happen across the episodes appeared to have ruined her character arc from the first television series to the point he found the quality of the series inexcusable for the staff members.

Kotaku praised the differences between Akane and the new Inspector, Mika Shimotsuki. Anime News Network found her to be different from her original Psycho-Pass traits, citing her mistreatment of Enforcers such as Nobuchika Ginoza, and also speculated that the character might have a crush on Yayoi Kunizuka, as Shimotsuki tends to favor her instead. The Fandom Post regarded Shimotsuki as a "too divisive character to say the least", commenting on the way she is used by Togane to attack Tsunemori. It said that Shimotsuki was "a really unlikeable co-protagonist due to the fact whilst she has her own views, she always gets into trouble and never seems to accept that it is her fault", and drew negative parallels with Akane Tsunemori's arc from the original series, saying that while Tsunemori often has detractors, she still manages to become more appealing due to her screentime. UK Anime Network said that, while Shimotsuki did not come across as likable, she is made more sympathetic by the difficulties she faces as a result of Togane and Sybil's manipulations. According to My Reviewer, while the series starts strong, by the eighth episode, the series jumps the shark due to poor handling of characters that make a major impact in the story. Nevertheless, the writer found the visual and voice acting appealing

In retrospective, Robert Frazer of UK Anime Network panned the anime, citing it as so unlikable he would rather see the prequel focused on Shinya Kogami's work as an inspector written in a manga. Comic Book Resources also panned it, calling it one of the biggest disappointments within anime as it failed to live up to the first series' popularity, lacking the cast that made it interesting, and the poor handling of Kirito Kamui's traps to the Sybil System.

References

2014 Japanese television seasons
Mag Garden manga
Noitamina
Psycho-Pass
Shōnen manga
Tatsunoko Production